Demiryurt is a village in the central district (Karaman) of Karaman Province, Turkey. It is situated to the west of Karadağ an extinct volcano. The population of the village was 247 as of 2011. The main economic activity of the village is agriculture.

References

Villages in Karaman Central District